Area code 618 is a telephone area code in the North American Numbering Plan (NANP) for southern Illinois. The numbering plan area (NPA) comprises one hundred and twenty-six municipalities, such as Carbondale, Cairo, Belleville, East St. Louis, Edwardsville, Marion, O'Fallon, Alton, Mt. Vernon, Centralia, Herrin, Salem, Metropolis, Fairview Heights, Collinsville, and Granite City. Area code 618 was one of the original North American area codes created in 1947.

History
When the American Telephone and Telegraph Company (AT&T) organized the nation's telephone networks in 1947 under a new nationwide telephone numbering plan, Illinois was divided into four numbering plan areas to accommodate large number of central offices that were necessary for the state's dense population and toll call routing infrastructure.

Area code 618 was assigned to a numbering plan area in southern Illinois, including the population centers of East St. Louis and Carbondale.

In 1954, most of Metro East of St. Louis switched from area code 217 to 618.

618 is the only one of Illinois' four original area codes that have not been split or overlaid. According to projections in 2021, 618 is expected to "exhaust" by 2025. Periodic proposals have been made for code relief for area code 618. Area code 730 is designated for overlay, which is expected to go in effect on July 7, 2023.

Prior to October 2021, area code 618 had telephone numbers assigned for the central office code 988. In 2020, 988 was designated nationwide as a dialing code for the National Suicide Prevention Lifeline, which created a conflict for exchanges that permit seven-digit dialing. This area code was therefore scheduled to transition to ten-digit dialing by October 24, 2021.

Cities in the service area

A-C
 Albion
 Altamont
 Alton
 Anna
 Ashley
 Ava
 Aviston
 Batchtown
 Beckemyer
 Belleville
 Benld
 Benton
 Bethalto
 Breese
 Brighton
 Brookport
 Brussels
 Bunker Hill
 Cahokia
 Cairo
 Carbondale
 Carlyle
 Carmi
 Carrier Mills
 Carterville
 Caseyville
 Centralia
 Centreville
 Chester
 Christopher
 Cisne
 Collinsville
 Columbia
 Creal Springs

D-L
 Dahlgren
 Dupo
 Du Quoin
 East St. Louis
 Edwardsville
 Eldorado
 Fairfield
 Fairview Heights
 Flora
 Freeburg
 Galatia
 Golconda
 Glen Carbon
 Golden Eagle
 Grafton
 Grand Tower
 Granite City
 Grayville
 Greenville
 Hamburg
 Hamel
 Hardin
 Harrisburg
 Hecker
 Herrin
 Highland
 Hurst
 Jerseyville
 Johnston City
 Johnsonville
 Jonesboro
 Kampsville
 Kinmundy
 Lawrenceville
 Louisville
 Lebanon

M-O
 Madison
 Marion
 Mascoutah
 McLeansboro
 Meppen
 Metropolis
 Michael
 Mound City
 Mounds
 Mount Carmel
 Mount Olive
 Mount Vernon
 Murphysboro
 New Athens
 New Baden
 Newton
 Nashville
 Nason
 O'Fallon
 Oakdale 
 Okawville
 Olney
 Orient

P-Z
 Pontoon Beach
 Pinckneyville
 Raleigh
 Red Bud
 Robinson
 Roxana
 Rosiclare
 Salem
 Scott Air Force Base
 Sesser
 Shawneetown
 Sims
 Smithton
 Sparta
 St. Elmo
 St. Francisville
 Staunton
 Sumner
 Swansea
 Tamms
 Trenton
 Troy
 Vandalia
 Venice
 Vergennes
 Vienna
 Wamac
 Washington Park
 Waterloo
 Wayne City
 West Frankfort
 Wood River
 Zeigler

See also
 List of NANP area codes
 List of Illinois area codes

External links

 List of exchanges from AreaCodeDownload.com, 618 Area Code

References

618
618
1947 establishments in Illinois